HHN may refer to:
 Frankfurt–Hahn Airport, serving Frankfurt am Main, Germany
 Hahn Air, a German airline
 Halloween Horror Nights, a seasonal Halloween event at Universal Studios theme parks
 Harakat Hezbollah al-Nujaba, an Iraqi paramilitary organisation
 Healing Heroes Network, an American veterans' organizations